La Cruz is a town in Corrientes Province, Argentina. It is the capital of San Martín Department, Corrientes.

La Cruz was founded in 1630.

See also
La Cruz

External links

 Municipal website

Populated places in Corrientes Province